Pindone is an anticoagulant drug for agricultural use. It is commonly used as a rodenticide in the management of rat and rabbit populations.

It is pharmacologically analogous to warfarin and inhibits the synthesis of Vitamin K-dependent clotting factors.

See also
 1,3-Indandione

References

Vitamin K antagonists
Rodenticides
Indandiones
Anticoagulant rodenticides